Television in France was introduced in 1931, when the first experimental broadcasts began. Colour television was introduced in October 1967 on La Deuxième Chaîne.

Digital terrestrial television 

The digital terrestrial television platform was launched on 31 March 2005 after a short testing period. Like Freeview in the UK, it provides many new channels, as well as the current terrestrial television stations. Like the rest of Europe, France uses the DVB-T transmission technology.

The 13 first digital free channels were launched on 31 March 2005. In October, 4 additional free channels were added: the 24h news channels BFM TV and I-Télé, the music and entertainment youth channel Europe 2 TV, and the free children channel Gulli, joint-venture between Lagardère Active and France Télévisions. Pay channels were progressively added until 2006: TPS Star, Paris Première, Canal+ Sport, Canal+ Cinéma, AB1, Planète, TF6, Canal J, LCI and Eurosport.

Regional channels started to launch on the TNT in 2007.

Due to the unsuccess of the pay-DTT, the terrestrial broadcast was abandoned by AB1 in October 2008 and Canal J on 30 April 2009.

On 14 December 2010, the CSA selected CFoot to relaunch a pay terrestrial channel. This channel was owned by the Ligue de Football Professionnel, to raise the stakes of French football leagues, and was launched in July 2011 on the LCN 34 of the TNT (formerly assigned to AB1). With the arrival of BeIN Sports, CFoot closed on 31 May 2012. In addition, TPS Star closed in the same month.

TF1 and M6 closed their pay channel TF6 on 31 December 2014. In early 2015, Eurosport ceased its terrestrial broadcast after TF1 sold it to Discovery.

By 2012, the digital terrestrial television services were expected to cover at least 95% of the French metropolitan population. Five high-definition (HD) channels (four free-to-air and one subscription) were launched in October 2008 using also the H.264 format. In September 2005, pay television channels were launched that use the MPEG-4 format, unlike most of Europe, which uses MPEG-2.

Pay-per-view terrestrial channels use H.264. TNT is the first service to implement Dolby Digital Plus as an audio codec on its high-definition channels. Viewers must buy a TV set (or set-top box) that supports both MPEG-4 H.264 and DD+ to enjoy HD channels.

Analog broadcasts were switched off on 30 November 2011 on all platforms, whether it is terrestrial, satellite or cable. Overseas departments and territories (such as French Guiana and Martinique) also terminated all analog broadcasts on the same day.

DTT transition
By 2008, 34% of the French population was using analogue TV as an only reception mode. The next year, the city of Coulommiers switched to digital-only TV, serving as a test city for TDF. By the end of 2009, analog TV was shut off in the Nord Cotentin, and TDF reported no major reception problems. Citizens in DTT test zones were informed that analog TV would shut down by early 2009, and consequently they adapted their installation.

For the rest of the country, the shut-off progressed by regions, more precisely France 3 regions. It means that every transmitters broadcasting France 3 Méditerranée Provence-Alpes went digital-terrestrial on the same date, another date for those that broadcast France 3 Bourgogne Franche-Comté. The analog shut-off occurred in 2010 in the north; the south was the last to phase out analog television broadcasts.

For three months before shutting down an analogue transmitter, it transmitted the DTT multiplexes so that viewers could adapt their installation on time. Also, a message was displayed as marquee on analog channels warning the viewer that he would no longer receive TV if he or she did not switch to digital. To help people installing their DTT reception equipment, the French government created "France Télé Numérique". It made didactic videos, television advertisements, and went through the local markets, to meet people and solve their problems regarding DTT reception.

Elderly people and those with restricted financial conditions, received help from the French government; so that they could switch to DTT easily.

The most common adapters sold in the market only decode MPEG-2 and have only one SCART output socket. Old TV sets (before 1980) need a UHF modulator between the TV and the set-top box, as they have no SCART socket. Unlike VCRs, DVB-T set-top boxes rarely include such a modulator, and a SCART to RCA adaptor is often needed to feed the modulator with the signal. The solution recommended by France Télé Numérique is just to buy a new TV set instead of using a modulator.

On 30 October 2008, the TNT HD was launched with four national channels: TF1, France 2, M6 and Arte.

On 8 June 2010, the overseas France dedicated channel France Ô became available nationally on TNT channel 19, taking the vacant frequencies of the pay channel AB1 which left the pay-DTT. Before, it was available locally in Île-de-France starting from 24 September 2007.

On 30 November 2010, the digital terrestrial television launched in Overseas France, with 8 public channels: La Première, France 2, France 3, France 4, France 5, France Ô, Arte and France 24 (replaced by France Info on 8 April 2019). Most territories also have up to three local private channels.

On 12 December 2012, six new HD national channels were launched (HD1, L'Équipe 21, 6ter, Numéro 23, RMC Découverte and Chérie 25).

On 5 April 2016, the Metropolitan France fully transitioned to MPEG-4 with HDTV for almost all channels, and LCI became free-to-air.

On 1 September 2016, France Télévisions launched its news channel France Info on channel 27. France Ô was downgraded to SD to make place for France Info.

France Ô closed on 24 August 2020. France Info was upgraded to HD in Metropolitan France, and La Première were upgraded to HD in Overseas France.

On 1 February 2021, France Télévisions launched  on channel 19, to promote cultural events during the COVID-19 pandemic. France 4 and France Info were downgraded to SD to make room on the multiplex. On 1 May, Culturebox starts timesharing with France 4, which upgraded to HD with France Info.

DTT on satellite
TNT channels are also available for reception by satellite, broadcast from the Astra satellites at 19.2° east with TNT SAT and from Atlantic Bird 3 with FRANSAT. Some of the channels are encrypted but there is no subscription charge, and both the set-top box and viewing card (valid for four years) that are required are available from hypermarkets.
The public channels France 2, France 3, France 5, France Ô, LCP and the Franco-German channel arte are free-to-air on Atlantic Bird 3.

During the 2010 FIFA World Cup, France 2 and France 3 were blacked out to viewers outside France. France 2, 3 and 4 were also blacked out outside France during the 2018 FIFA World Cup when they shared French TV rights for the tournament with TF1 and beIN Sports.

Other technologies 
Most internet service providers in France now offer digital television (IPTV) packages through triple-play set-top box as part of fibre link packages or DSL link packages. However, some DSL subscribers have too much attenuation distortion on their lines to benefit from the service, and France does not yet have 100% DSL coverage. The main IPTV providers are Orange, SFR, Free and Bouygues Telecom.

French cable providers France Telecom Cable, Noos SA and UPC France SA and Numericable merged to become the largest cable operator in France which was then merged info SFR. SFR cable offer is part of their very high speed offer and provides cable television and IPTV using FTLA approach EuroDocsis 3.0 compatible set top boxes.

Digital satellite television in France was launched in 1996. HDTV transmissions began in April 2006, when CanalSat launched its first HD channel (Canal+ HD). Télévision Par Satellite and CanalSat have merged in 2007, leaving Nouveau Canalsat and Bis Télévisions as the two main competitors for the satellite television market in the country.

Media groups

Dominant groups 
Four companies dominate the French TV market :

 Groupe TF1 (owned by Bouygues), which owns TF1, TMC, TFX, TF1 Séries Films and LCI
 France Télévisions, which regroups state-owned channels meaning France 2, France 3, France 4, France 5, franceinfo: and 45% of Arte's shares
 Groupe M6 (owned by RTL Group), which owns M6, W9, 6ter and Gulli
 Groupe Canal+ (owned by Vivendi), which owns Canal+, C8, CNews and CStar

Other important groups 
 NextRadioTV (owned by Altice): BFM TV, RMC Story, RMC Découverte, and many BFM regional declensions
 NRJ Group: NRJ 12, Chérie 25

Minor group
 Groupe Amaury (L'Équipe)

Viewing shares
Yearly viewing shares in 2019 (not including subscription channels):

LCP-Public Sénat and France Ô (now defunct) are uncounted because they are not destined to be profitable.

French programming

Universal Channel 
 30 Rock
 About a Boy
 Batwoman 
 Burn Notice
 Cardinal
 Chicago Fire 
 Chicago Justice
 Chicago Med
 Chicago P.D.
 Chuck
 CSI: Crime Scene Investigation 
 Dexter
 Eureka
 Fairly Legal 
 Flipping Out
 Flashpoint
 Grimm
 Haven
 House
 In Plain Sight
 Law & Order 
 Law & Order: Special Victims Unit 
 Law & Order: Criminal Intent 
 Law & Order: Los Angeles
 Law & Order: Trial by Jury
 Law & Order: UK
 Mercy
 Monk
 Murder in the First 
 Nurse Jackie
 Outsourced 
 Parenthood 
 Psych
 Rookie Blue
 Royal Pains
 Sea Patrol
 Sherlock
 Smash
 Shattered
 Stalker
 State of Affairs
 The Big C
 The Closer : L.A enquêtes prioritaires
 The Event
 The Office
 The Real Housewives of Beverly Hills
 The Real Housewives of Orange County 
 The Real Housewives of New York City
 The Real Housewives of Potomac
 The Real Housewives of Toronto
 The Pretender
 The Shield
 The Unusuals 
 Top Chef: All-Stars
 Top Chef Junior
 Top Chef Masters
 True Blood
 Veronica Mars 
 Walker, Texas Ranger 
 Warehouse 13

France 2 

 Agatha Christie's Poirot 
 Broadchurch 
 Castle
 The Closer 
 Grounded for Life
 Major Crimes 
 Minuit, le soir
 The O.C.
 Private Practice 
 Rizzoli & Isles 
 Water Rats
 Without a Trace

13ème Rue 

 100 Code
 Against the Wall
 Aquarius
 Bates Motel
 Battlestar Galactica
 Burn Notice
 Candice Renoir
 Cape Town
 Castle
 Catching Milat
 Chance
 Cherif
 Chicago Fire
 Chicago Justice
 CHiPS
 Chosen
 Condor
 Coyote
 Cracked
 Departure
 Dig
 The Disappearance 
 EZ Streets
 F/X: The Series
 Fairly Legal
 Ghost Stories
 Hannibal
 High Incident
 In Plain Sight
 Joan of Arcadia
 Karen Sisco
 Kindred: The Embraced
 Knight Rider
 Kojak
 L.A. Heat
 Law & Order
 Law & Order: Criminal Intent
 Law & Order: Los Angeles
 Law & Order: Special Victims Unit
 Law & Order: Organized Crime
 Law & Order: Trial by Jury
 Law & Order True Crime
 Life
 Lucifer
 Magnum
 Major Crimes
 Mammon
 Mannix
 Miami Vice
 Midnight Caller
 Midsomer Murders
 Missing (2012)
 Modus
 Motive
 Mr. & Mrs. Smith
 My Life is Murder
 Mysterious Ways
 Navarro
 New York Undercover
 Night Visions
 Perversions of Science
 Played
 Players
 Psych
 Quantum Leap
 ReGenesis
 Rookie Blue
 She Spies
 Shoot the Messenger
 Shooter
 Sliders
 State of Affairs
 Tales from the Crypt
 Tequila and Bonetti
 The A-Team
 The Burning Zone
 The Bridge
 The Chicago Code
 The Fall
 The Family
 The Hunger
 The Listener
 The Outer Limits
 The Shield
 The Twilight Zone
 Third Watch
 True Justice
 Veronica Mars
 Wicked City
 Zen

See also 
 List of television stations in France
 List of French language television channels
 List of French television series
 List of years in French television

References